Hans Krostina (14 August 1948 – 4 February 2019) was a German football player and manager who played as a midfielder.

References

1948 births
2019 deaths
German footballers
Association football midfielders
Bundesliga players
2. Bundesliga players
Fortuna Düsseldorf players
SC Fortuna Köln players
SV Arminia Hannover players
KFC Turnhout players
A.S.V. Oostende K.M. players
Rot-Weiss Essen players
FC Bayern Hof players
MTV Ingolstadt players
German football managers
FC Vaduz managers
German expatriate footballers
German expatriate football managers
German expatriate sportspeople in Belgium
Expatriate footballers in Belgium
German expatriate sportspeople in Switzerland
Expatriate football managers in Switzerland